Orange Heights is a neighborhood in Pasadena, California, United States. It is bordered by Jackson Street to the north, Mountain Street to the south, Los Robles Avenue to the west, and El Molino Avenue to the east.

Education
Orange Heights is served by Longfellow Elementary School, Eliot Middle School, and John Muir High School.

Transportation
Orange Heights is served by Metro Local routes 256 and 662, as well as Pasadena Transit routes 31 and 32.

Government
Orange Heights is part of City Council District 3, represented by John J Kennedy, and District 5, represented by Jessica Rivas.

Neighborhoods in Pasadena, California